Robert Roripaugh (August 26, 1930 – January 2, 2019) was an American poet. He was the poet laureate of Wyoming from 1995 to 2002. He became a professor of English at his alma mater, the University of Wyoming. Roripaugh died on January 2, 2019, in Laramie, Wyoming.

References

2018 deaths
1930 births
People from Oxnard, California
University of Wyoming alumni
University of Wyoming faculty
Poets Laureate of Wyoming